Carmen Martín Gaite (8 December 1925 – 23 July 2000) was a Spanish author. She wrote many novels, short stories, screenplays, and essays, across many genres. Gaite was awarded the Premio Nadal in 1957 for Entre visillos, the Prince of Asturias Awards in 1988, the Award Premio Castilla y León de las Letras in 1992, and the Premio Acebo de Honor for her life's work.

Biography
Carmen Martín Gaite was born on December 8, 1925, in Salamanca. She was the second daughter of José Martín López (Valladolid, 1885) and María Gaite Veloso (Orense, 1894), who married in 1923. Her parents had met in Salamanca, where her father worked as a notary. Her mother and maternal grandparents were from Orense. Her grandfather was a professor of geography, and her great uncle founded the Ateneo of Orense and was a director and a publisher of the newspaper called El Orensano. The family used to spend their summers on her grandparents farm in San Lorenzo de Piñor (Barbadás), five kilometers away from Orense. These trips were the basis of her connection with Galicia and its culture. It encouraged her to write some of her works, such as Las ataduras and Retahílas.

Martín Gaite was born and grew up in the city of Salamanca. Her father, who had liberal ideas, did not want her to be educated in a religious institute, so instead of attending school, she was taught at home by private tutors and her father, who was fascinated by history and literature.

The start of the Spanish Civil War prevented Martín Gaite from attending the last two years of High School at the School Institute of Madrid, as her sister Ana had done before her. Thus, she had to complete her secondary education at the Women's School Institute of Salamanca, an environment reflected in her novel, Entre visillos. There, she was taught by Rafael Lapesa and Salvador Fernández Ramírez. They would be future members of the Real Academia Española (Royal Spanish Academy) and their influence would leave a mark on her and her literary vocation.

In 1943, she studied Philosophy at the University of Salamanca, where she was taught by Francisco Maldonado, Antonio Tovar, Manuel García Calvo and Alonso Zamora Vicente. In the first year, she met Ignacio Aldecoa and Agustín García Calvo. In those years, she contributed to the magazine Trabajos y días, where her first poems would appear. She also became interested in the theatre, taking part in several plays as an actress. During the summer of 1946, she was awarded a grant by the University of Coimbra, where she strengthened her interest in Portuguese-Galician culture.

In the summer of 1948, after finishing her degree in Romance Languages, she was awarded a scholarship for further studies abroad in the Collège International de Cannes. There, she perfected her French and became familiar with a more open and cosmopolitan society. That same year, she moved to Madrid in order to prepare her Ph.D. thesis on XIII Galician-Portuguese chansonnier, which she would not complete. In Madrid, Ignacio Aldecoa introduced her to a literary circle that included some of the writers who were part of the Generation of '50. Significant members of this generation were: Medardo Fraile, Alfonso Sastre, Mayrata O'Wisiedo, Jesús Fernández Santos, Rafael Sánchez Ferlosio, Josefina Aldecoa, and Carlos Edmundo de Ory.

She was married to fellow writer Rafael Sánchez Ferlosio.

Bibliography

Novels
Entre visillos (1957) (premio Nadal)
Ritmo lento (1963)
Retahílas (1974)
Fragmentos de interior (1976) 
El cuarto de atrás (1978)
Nubosidad variable (1992)
Variable Cloud (1996) (Translation of Nubosidad variable, (1992)
La Reina de las Nieves (1994)
Lo raro es vivir (1996)
Irse de casa (1998) 
The Back Room (2000) (Translation of El cuarto de atrás, (1978)
Los parentescos (2001) (posthumous, unfinished)
Usos amorosos de la posguerra española

Short stories
El balneario (1954)
Las ataduras (1960)
Cuentos completos (1978)

Children's literature
El castillo de las tres murallas (1981)
El pastel del diablo (1985)
Caperucita en Manhattan (1990)

Theatre
A palo seco (1957)
La hermana pequeña (1959)

Television
Teresa de Jesús (see article) (1984 miniseries)

Poetry
A rachas (1976)

Essays
El proceso de Macanaz (1969)
Usos amorosos del dieciocho en España (1972)
La búsqueda de interlocutor y otras búsquedas (1973)
El cuento de nunca acabar (1983)
Usos amorosos de la postguerra española (1987)
Desde la ventana (1987)
Agua pasada (1992)
Cuadernos de todo (2002)

Translation
Madame Bovary (1993)

References

1925 births
2000 deaths
People from Salamanca
Spanish women novelists
Spanish women poets
Spanish women essayists
20th-century Spanish women writers
20th-century Spanish poets
20th-century translators
20th-century Spanish novelists
University of Salamanca alumni
20th-century essayists